Doctor Crippen or Doctor Crippen on Board is a 1942 German crime film directed by Erich Engels and starring Rudolf Fernau, René Deltgen, and .

It was shot at the Barrandov and Hostivar Studios in Prague. The film's sets were designed by the art directors Artur Günther and Willi Eplinius.

Cast

References

External links

Films of Nazi Germany
German historical films
German crime films
German black-and-white films
1942 crime films
1940s historical films
Films directed by Erich Engels
Films set in London
Seafaring films
Films set in the 1910s
Crime films based on actual events
1940s German-language films
1940s German films